"Time to Give" (stylized as ⠞⠊⠍⠑ ⠞⠕ ⠛⠊⠧⠑ in Braille) is the lead single off of White Lies' fifth studio album, Five. The single was released on 17 September 2018 through PIAS Recordings.

Background 
The album was first announced by the band on 17 September 2018 with the corresponding release of their first single, "Time to Give", which clocked in at 7 minutes, the longest single by the band to date. That same day the release date of 1 February 2019 was announced, as well as the Spring 2019 European tour. On the new album, White Lies described the album as a milestone in their career, as they have been active for a decade. "It marks our decade as a band, which has pushed us to expand our sound and reach new territory artistically — it marks the start of a new and exciting chapter for us."

In describing the song McVeigh felt the track and album had more eclectic and guitar-dominated influences to allow for a more varied record. "We thought it would be something that would work, to have these songs pull you off in a number of different tangents, and taking you to different places. And the production leans towards more guitars on the album. It’s a bit heavier, like how we explored on our first two albums. And we tried to do a few stranger things, with songs like ‘Time To Give’, which was the first song we released."

Track listing

References

External links 
 

2018 singles
2018 songs
White Lies (band) songs
PIAS Recordings singles